Events from the year 1759 in France

Incumbents
 Monarch – Louis XV

Events
4 March–20 November – Étienne de Silhouette serves as Controller-General
13 April – Battle of Bergen

Births

Full date missing
Jacques Desjardin, military officer (died 1807)

Deaths

Full date missing
Lambert-Sigisbert Adam, sculptor (born 1700)
Pierre Louis Maupertuis, mathematician and philosopher (born 1698)
Louis de Caix d'Hervelois, composer (born c.1670)
Louis-Joseph de Montcalm, military officer (born 1712)
Antoine Magnol, physician and botanist (born 1676)
Marie Louise Trichet, Catholic figure (born 1684)
Antoine Gaubil, Jesuit missionary (born 1689)

See also

References

1750s in France